Hanneke Jewel Cassel (born April 14, 1978) is an American folk violinist. She was raised in Oregon and graduated with a Bachelor of Music in Violin Performance at Berklee College of Music in 2000. Hanneke is the 1997 United States National Scottish Fiddle Champion, and she has performed and taught across the United States, Scotland, Sweden, China, New Zealand, France, England, and Austria.

Her debut album, My Joy, received the following feedback from Alasdair Fraser:"A great debut album by one of the most talented and fun-loving young fiddlers you could ever hope to meet! This is fiddle music played with great stylistic integrity and personal flair - definitely a joy to listen to! Go Hanneke, and gie it laldie!"

Awards
1998 Berklee College of Music String Department Award
1997 U.S. National Scottish Fiddle Champion
1996 Oregon State Texas-style Grand Fiddle Champion
1996 Berklee College of Music U.S. Scholarship Tour Award
1992 and 1994 U.S. National Junior Scottish Fiddle Champion

Discography
Trip to Walden Pond (© 2017 Cassel Records) (release date April 14, 2017)
Dot the Dragon's Eyes (© 2013 Cassel Records)
For Reasons Unseen (© 2009 Cassel Records)
Calm the Raging Sea (© 2007 Cassel Records)
Silver (© 2006 Cassel Records), produced by Laura Risk
Some Melodious Sonnet (© 2004 Cassel Records), produced by Laura Risk
Many Happy Returns (© 2003 Cassel Records)
My Joy ( © 2001 Cassel Records), produced by Laura Risk
Darol Anger’s Diary of a Fiddler (© 1999 Compass Records)
The Wee Hours: Future of Scottish Fiddling in America (© 1998 Gargoyle Records)

See also
Laura Risk

References

Folk fiddlers
Progressive bluegrass musicians
American bluegrass fiddlers
Musicians from Oregon
Living people
1978 births
21st-century violinists